Wabash Township is one of the twenty townships of Darke County, Ohio, United States. The 2010 census found 887 people in the township, 651 of whom lived in the unincorporated portions of the township.

Geography
Located in the northern part of the county, it borders the following townships:
Marion Township, Mercer County - northeast
Patterson Township - east
York Township - south
Allen Township - west
Granville Township, Mercer County - northwest

The village of North Star is located in central Wabash Township.

Name and history
Wabash Township was established in 1841, and most likely was named after the Wabash River. It is the only Wabash Township statewide.

Government
The township is governed by a three-member board of trustees, who are elected in November of odd-numbered years to a four-year term beginning on the following January 1. Two are elected in the year after the presidential election and one is elected in the year before it. There is also an elected township fiscal officer, who serves a four-year term beginning on April 1 of the year after the election, which is held in November of the year before the presidential election. Vacancies in the fiscal officership or on the board of trustees are filled by the remaining trustees.  The current trustees are Mike Stephan, Ed Brand, and Larry Bubeck, and the clerk is Carolyn Wilker.

References

External links
County website

Townships in Darke County, Ohio
Townships in Ohio